Japanese Heavy Rock Hits is a collection of singles by the Japanese experimental band Boris. Volume 1 was released on September 14, 2009 through the label Southern Lord Records; the successive volumes followed one per month afterward. Artwork for each single is in a glam rock cliché and features a single band member whose style is prominent on the songs on the accompanying release; the fourth single, a cover song, has a transparent PVC sleeve, and was bundled with preorders of the series along with a T-shirt. The only physical release was on separate 7" vinyl records, though digital versions (save vol. 4) in MP3 and FLAC were available from online retailers.

Initial track list information included "8" as track 2 on Heavy Rocks and "16:47:52..." as track 6 on Attention Please, but the official preorder revealed they were replaced by "Leak -Truth,yesnoyesnoyes-" and "You" respectively. Two alternate mixes of "Black Original" were used for the Japanese release of New Album, and a live version of "8" is featured as a download bonus for Noise.

Track listing

Credits
 Takeshi – Vocals, guitar and bass
 Wata – Vocals, guitar
 Atsuo – Vocals, drums and percussion
 Souichiro Nakamura – Mixing and Mastering (volumes 1-3)
 Fangsanalsatan – Recording, logo type, mixing and mastering (volume 4)
 SOMA – Design
 Miki Matsushima – Photography

References

2009 compilation albums
Boris (band) albums